Norma Zimmer (July 13, 1923 – May 10, 2011) was an American vocalist, best remembered for her 22-year tenure as Lawrence Welk's "Champagne Lady" on The Lawrence Welk Show.

Early years
Born Norma Larsen on a dairy farm in Shoshone County, Idaho, she grew up in Seattle, Washington after her father moved the family west when she was 2 years old. Her father was a violin teacher, and Zimmer had hoped to play that instrument until he told her that her hands were too small. She was offered a scholarship to Seattle University but chose to continue vocal studies.

Zimmer was singing in a church choir when a guest artist suggested she travel to Los Angeles, California and audition for a musical group. When she turned 18, she did just that, singing with a succession of top vocal groups, including the Norman Luboff Choir and the Ken Darby Singers, among others.

Norma married builder and property developer Randy Zimmer in 1944, and settled in Los Angeles. They were married for 64 years until Randy's death in 2008. The couple had two sons, Mark and Ron.

Radio
Zimmer's radio network debut as a soloist came February 28, 1947, on Sparkle Time. At that time, she performed weekly on the program as a member of The Singers vocal group. She later became the soloist on Standard School.

Television
She appeared on most of the popular television variety shows during the 1950s. She landed a small singing part in the Bing Crosby movie Mr. Music (1950), and provided the singing voice for the White Rose in the Disney film Alice in Wonderland (1951). She worked as a studio singer and performed on Welk's 1956 Thanksgiving album.

Lawrence Welk Show
In 1959, the previous Champagne Lady Alice Lon left the show because of monetary and scheduling disagreements. Because of protests, Welk tried (and failed) to get Lon back. After a year of the show's trying out several different singers, Zimmer officially joined The Lawrence Welk Show as his Champagne Lady on New Year's Eve, 1960. Zimmer stayed on the show and traveled with Welk and the band on personal appearances for three years.

As her two sons were growing up, Norma decided to leave show business to raise her children. Welk told her it was all right for her to quit the road tours, but he asked her to stay on the television show until he could find another singer. Each week, a new girl came on as a possible replacement, but Welk kept asking Zimmer to come back the following week. That went on for twenty years. As the show's Champagne Lady, Zimmer sang one solo and often a duet (usually with Jimmy Roberts); she frequently danced with Welk at the end of the show.

Recordings
Zimmer sang as lead soprano with the Norman Luboff Choir, Voices of Walter Schumann, Pete King Chorale, and the Ken Darby Singers. She also sang with a quartet, The Girlfriends, along with Betty Allan and others. They sang backup for Frank Sinatra, Dean Martin, Perry Como, and others. Their group sang backup for the famous Bing Crosby version of Irving Berlin's "White Christmas".

Zimmer also recorded solo albums for Word Records.

Christian music
In 1972, Zimmer "traveled about 80,000 miles singing God's praises at religious concerts." She sang with the Billy Graham Crusade and on the Hour of Power and was a soloist at a White House service during the Nixon Administration. In addition, Zimmer recorded a number of albums devoted to traditional Christian music.

Other activities
Zimmer painted as a hobby. She created more than 100 paintings, primarily portraits. In business matters, she and her husband owned the ski lodge at Kratka Ridge and had a mobile home park with more than 100 spaces.

Death
In 2011, Zimmer died at her home in Brea, California at the age of 87.

Bibliography

References

External links

1923 births
2011 deaths
American performers of Christian music
American women singers
American sopranos
Actresses from Idaho
Actresses from Seattle
Singers from Idaho
Musicians from Seattle
People from Brea, California
People from Shoshone County, Idaho
American people of Norwegian descent
American people of Finnish descent
Lawrence Welk
Word Records artists